The 2010 Individual European Championship will be the 10th UEM Individual Speedway European Championship season. The final took place on 4 September 2010 in Tarnów, Poland. The defending champion is Renat Gafurov from Russia.

Qualifying rounds

Semi-finals

Final 
 4 September 2010
  Tarnów, Lesser Poland Voivodeship
 Stadion Miejski w Tarnowie (Length: 392 m)
 Referee:  Krister Gardell
 Jury President:  Serhiy Lyatosinskyy
 References

See also 
 motorcycle speedway
 2010 Individual Speedway Junior European Championship

References 

2010
European Individual
Speedway competitions in Poland